This Is My Blood is the second studio album by the death metal band Soul Embraced.

Critical reception

Awarding the album three stars at AllMusic, Tom Semioli writes, "In a genre that thrives on formula and repetition, Soul Embraced adds a welcome blast of soul on This Is My Blood." Marc Lungley, giving the album an eight out of ten from Cross Rhythms, states, "This has stamina to be a regular on the shelf of any metal fan." Writing for The Phanton Tollbooth, Duncann Tripp says, "Good listening all around."

Track listing

Credits
Soul Embraced
 Rocky Gray - Guitar, Bass, Backing Vocals, Mixing
 Lance Garvin - Drums
 Chad Moore - Lead Vocals
Additional Musicians
 Arthur Green - Bass
 John LeCompt - Guitar
Production
 Ray Brooks - Mixing, Engineer
 Brandon Ebel - Executive Producer
 Johnathan Parker - Engineer
 Brian Gardner - Mastering
 Roy Culver - A&R
Art
 Don Clark - Layout, Design
 Travis Smith - Artwork
 Reagan Karras - Photography

References

Soul Embraced albums
Solid State Records albums
2002 albums
Albums with cover art by Travis Smith (artist)